Chamberlain Field was an American football stadium in Chattanooga, Tennessee. It hosted the University of Tennessee at Chattanooga football team until they moved to Finley Stadium in 1997. It officially opened on June 3, 1908, and was named in honor of former University of Chattanooga trustee Hiram S. Chamberlain. When it closed, it was the second oldest on-campus college football stadium after Harvard Stadium.

The stadium held 10,501 people at its peak and was opened in 1908. The Vine Street grandstands were pulled down in 2004, and the Oak street grandstands were torn down in August 2011.

References

Defunct college football venues
Chattanooga Mocs football
Sports venues in Chattanooga, Tennessee
American football venues in Tennessee
1908 establishments in Tennessee
Sports venues completed in 1908